The  is an  executive department of the Government of Japan responsible for preserving the peace and independence of Japan, and maintaining the country’s national security and the Japan Self-Defense Forces.

The ministry is headed by the Minister of Defense, and is the largest ministry in the Japanese government. The ministry is headquartered in Ichigaya, Shinjuku, Tokyo, and is required by Article 66 of the Constitution to be completely subordinate to civilian authority. Its head has the rank of Minister of State. He is assisted by two vice ministers, one parliamentary and one administrative; and the internal bureaus. The highest figure in the command structure is the Prime Minister, who is responsible directly to the National Diet. The MOD, alongside the Ministry of Foreign Affairs, work on crafting Japanese security policy.

In a national emergency, the Prime Minister is authorized to order the various components of the Japan Self-Defense Forces (JSDF) into action, subject to the consent of the Diet. In times of extreme emergency, that approval might be obtained after the fact.

History 

On 8 June 2006, the Cabinet of Japan endorsed a bill elevating the  under the Cabinet Office to full-fledged cabinet-level . On 9 June 2006, the "Bill for Partial Revision of the Defense Agency Establishment Law" was submitted in the Diet. On 30 November 2006, the "Bill for Partial Revision of the Defense Agency Establishment Law" was passed by the House of Representatives. A bill that relates to the transition of the JDA from agency to a ministry under the Defense Agency Establishment Law on 15 December 2006 with approval from the House of Councillors. This had support from the LDP, Democratic Party of Japan, Komeito and the People's New Party representatives. in the House of Representatives and in the House of Councillors. Only the Japanese Communist Party and the Social Democratic Party opposed the change, claiming that it can lead Japan into a future war. Meanwhile, the Asia-Pacific nations raised concerns due to memories of World War II when they were under Japanese imperial rule.

The Ministry of Defense was formally established on 9 January 2007, taking its present name and status as a ministry. Subsequently, its Defense Facilities Administrative Agency was dissolved and integrated into the Ministry of Defense.

In July 2007, the Ministry of Defense Building was attacked by a 21-year-old right-wing activist, who threw a Molotov cocktail in the direction of the building, after forcing his way through the main gate.

Defense Agency 
The Japanese Defense Agency was established on 1 July 1954. Until May 2000, it was based in Akasaka (currently occupied by Tokyo Midtown). The JDA was placed under the authority of the Prime Minister's Office under Article 2 of the Defense Agency Establishment Law before it was placed under the Cabinet Office in 2001.

The internal bureaus, especially the Bureau of Defense Policy, Bureau of Finance, and the Bureau of Equipment, are often headed by officials from other ministries and are the main centers of power and instruments of civilian control in the Defense Agency. The Bureau of Defense Policy is responsible for drafting defense policy and programs, for determining day-to-day operational activities, and for information gathering and analysis in the JSDF. The Bureau of Finance is instrumental in developing the Defense Agency budget and in establishing spending priorities for the Defense Agency and the JSDF. The Bureau of Equipment, organized into subunits for each of the military services, focuses on equipment procurement. Before any major purchase is recommended to the Diet by the Defense Agency, it has to be reviewed by each of these bureaus.

Below these civilian groups are the uniformed JSDF personals. Its senior officer is the chairman of the Joint Staff Council, a body that included the chiefs of staff of the ground, maritime, and air arms of the Self-Defense Forces. Its principal functions are to advise the director general and to plan and execute joint exercises. The three branches maintain staff offices to manage operations in their branches. Although rank establishes echelons of command within the JSDF, all three branches are immediately responsible to the director general and are coequal bodies with the Joint Staff Council and the three staff offices.

This structure precludes the concentration of power of the pre-1945 Imperial General Staff (and the Supreme War Council) general staffs, but it impedes interservice coordination, and there are few formal exchanges among commanders from various branches. Moreover, some dissatisfaction has been reported by high-ranking officers who feel they have little power compared with younger civilian officials in the bureaus, who most often have no military experience. To rectify this situation and to increase input by the JSDF in policy matters, in the early 1980s the Joint Staff Council was enlarged to establish better lines of communication between the internal bureaus and the three staff offices. A computerized central command and communications system and various tactical command and communications systems were established, linking service and field headquarters with general headquarters at the Defense Agency and with one another.

In the 1980s, efforts were also underway to facilitate a clear and efficient command policy in the event of a crisis. The government stood by the principle that military action was permitted only under civilian control, but in recognition that delay for consultation might prove dangerous, ships of the Japan Maritime Self-Defense Force (JMSDF) began to be armed with live torpedoes, and fighter-interceptors were allowed to carry missiles at all times. Although aircraft had long been allowed to force down intruders without waiting for permission from the prime minister, ships were still required to receive specific orders before interdicting invading vessels. The Defense Agency had recommended drawing up more complete guidelines to clarify what action JSDF combat units could take in emergencies.

Cooperation between the JSDF and other civilian agencies in contingency planning is limited. No plans exist to ensure the support of civilian aircraft and merchant fleets in times of crisis, even though the JSDF transportation capabilities are generally judged inadequate. In 1990 legislation was being studied to provide the JSDF with the ability to respond in emergency situations not specifically covered by Article 76 of the Self-Defense Forces Law.

Modern equipment is gradually replacing obsolescent materiel in the JSDF. In 1987, the Defense Agency replaced its communications system (which formerly had relied on telephone lines of the Nippon Telegraph and Telephone) with a microwave network incorporating a three-dimensional transmission system using a communications satellite. Despite efforts to increase stocks, however, supplies of ammunition and maintenance and repair parts in 1990 remained at less than satisfactory levels.

In 2004, the Defense Agency building was attacked by a Kakurōkyō cell through improvised mortar barrages.

Ministerial team
The Ministers in the Ministry of Defense are as follows:

Senior officials

Senior Advisers
The Senior Advisers to the Minister of Defense are senior policy advisers to the Minister of Defense.

Special Advisers
The Special Advisers to the Minister of Defense are special policy advisers to the Minister of Defense.

Vice Minister and other officials
The Administrative Vice-Minister of Defense, the senior civil-servant at the Ministry of Defense, has the role of coordinating the affairs of the Ministry and of supervising the Ministry's bureaus and organs.

Military Commanders
The Chief of Staff, Joint Staff is the highest-ranking military officer of the Japan Self-Defense Forces, and the senior military adviser to the Minister of Defense and the Japanese Government. He is supported by the Vice Chief of Staff, Joint Staff. He is appointed by the Minister of Defense, approved by the Cabinet.

Organization
The Ministry of Defense includes a number of organizations as of 2022:

External Agencies

References
  - Japan

External links

Ministry of Defense
  (in Japanese)
  (in English)
 
  (in Japanese)
 

 
Defense Ministry
Japan
1954 establishments in Japan
Ministries established in 2007
Postwar Japan
Shinjuku